Justinas Bonaventura Pranaitis or Pronaitis (27 July 1861 – 28 January 1917) was a Lithuanian Catholic priest and Professor of Hebrew at the St. Petersburg Roman Catholic Theological Academy. He is best known as the author of the antisemitic text The Talmud Unmasked, and his subsequent involvement in the Bellis trial.

Early life and career
Pranaitis was born to a peasant family in Griškabūdis, Lithuania, then part of the Russian Empire, and was schooled at the Marijampolė Gymnasium. He attended the Sejny Priest Seminary and graduated with a Master of Theology degree in 1887.

In 1892 he published an antisemitic tract called Christianus in Talmude Iudaeorum in Latin , adapted from his Master's thesis, under the imprimatur of the Archbishop Metropolitan of Mogilev, which was subsequently translated into Polish (1892), French (1892), German (1894), Russian (1911), Lithuanian (1912), Italian (1939), English (1939) and Spanish.  The English translation of the book is titled The Talmud Unmasked: The Secret Rabbinical Teachings Concerning Christians (usually shortened to The Talmud Unmasked). 

In 1894, Pranaitis was subject to legal proceedings on a charge of blackmail (for demanding 1000 rubles from a framing workshop in indemnification for a spoilt cheap picture which he claimed to be a picture by Murillo). For some time he was banished to Tver. From 1902, he served as a priest in Tashkent.

Beilis trial
Pranaitis rose to fame in the blood libel case of Menahem Mendel Beilis (or Beiliss) in Russia in 1912, by which time he had already been defrocked as a Catholic priest. Beilis was accused of murdering a Christian child to take his blood for alleged Jewish rituals, and for Matzah for Passover. Pranaitis was called as an expert witness to testify to the Talmudic hatred of Christians, as described in his book;  one police department official is quoted as saying:
The course of the trial will depend on how the ignorant jury will perceive arguments of priest Pranaitis, who is sure about the reality of ritual murders. I think, as a priest he is able to talk with peasants and to convince them. As a scientist, who defended a thesis about this question, he will give props to the court and prosecution, though nothing can be guessed in advance yet. I became acquainted with Pranaitis and am firmly convinced that he is the person who knows the problem, about which he will talk, in depth... Everything, then, will depend on which arguments priest Pranaitis will furnish, and he has them, and they're shattering for Jewry.

His credibility rapidly evaporated, however, when the defence demonstrated his ignorance of some simple Talmudic concepts and definitions, such as hullin, to the point where "many in the audience occasionally laughed out loud when he clearly became confused and couldn't even intelligibly answer some of the questions asked by [Beilis'] lawyer". Rebekah Marks Costin's account in Robert Garber's Jews on Trial quotes the key exchange of the trial which served to destroy Pranaitis' credibility: 
Q: What is the meaning of the word Hullin [animals permissible as food]?A: I don't know.Q: What is the meaning of the word Erubin [Sabbath walking limits]?A: I don't know.Q: What is the meaning of the word Yebamot [family relationships]?A: I don't know.Q: When did Baba Batra live and what was her activity?A: I don't know.
The last question "was fatal once it was tactfully explained to the jury. Baba Batra is a tractate of the Talmud, quite well known to scholars, students, and many Jewish laymen." A Tsarist secret police agent would later report on Pranaitis' testimony, saying:
Cross-examination of Pranaitis has weakened the evidential value of his expert opinion, exposing lack of knowledge of texts and insufficient knowledge of Jewish literature. Because of his amateurish knowledge and lack of resourcefulness, Pranaitis' expert opinion is of very low value. 
Beilis was found not guilty.

Later life
Pranaitis was later defrocked, and died in 1917 of heart disease.

See also 
Criticism of the Talmud
Leo Frank
Dreyfus affair
History of the Jews in Russia and Soviet Union

References

1861 births
1917 deaths
People from Šakiai District Municipality
People from Augustów Governorate
Roman Catholics from the Russian Empire
Hebraists
Laicized Roman Catholic priests
19th-century Lithuanian Roman Catholic priests
20th-century Lithuanian Roman Catholic priests